Sándor Egeresi (25 June 1964 – 5 September 2021) was an ethnic Hungarian politician from Serbia.

Biography 
Egeresi was born in Bačka Topola, SAP Vojvodina, SFR Yugoslavia. He finished elementary and secondary school in Bačka Topola after which he graduated from the School of Law. During the early 1990s, he was an active participant and organizer of peace movements in Vojvodina (peace concert in Bačka Topola, organization of anti-war petition, parliamentary activities).

He served as The President of the Assembly of the Autonomous Province of Vojvodina from 2008 to 2012. He was elected the President of the Assembly of the Autonomous Province of Vojvodina at the constitutive session held on 16 July 2008. He was a member of the Alliance of Vojvodina Hungarians.

He has been a member of the Alliance of Vojvodina Hungarians since its establishment. During several terms of office, he performed various functions as the party official (the Vice-President, member of the Presidency, member of the Council, President of the Council and President of municipal organization of the Alliance of Vojvodina Hungarians (SVM) in Bačka Topola).

References 

1964 births
2021 deaths
Presidents of the Assembly of Vojvodina
Members of the Assembly of Vojvodina
Alliance of Vojvodina Hungarians politicians
People from Bačka Topola
Serbian Roman Catholics
Ethnic Hungarian politicians in Vojvodina